Luigi Andrea Della Rocca (born 2 September 1984) is an Italian former footballer who played as a forward.

Club career

Triestina
Della Rocca was signed by Triestina in January 2007 in a co-ownership deal for €350,000. In June 2009 Della Rocca was signed by Triestina outright for another €150,000.

Lega Pro clubs
Della Rocca signed a 3-year contract with Lega Pro Prima Divisione club Portogruaro in mid-2011. He left for Carpi on 31 January 2013.

In January 2014 Della Rocca was signed by Cremonese.

On 11 July 2014 Della Rocca was signed by U.S. Lecce. On 2 February 2015 Della Rocca was signed by Novara in a temporary deal, with Jacopo Manconi and Gustavo Vagenin moved to opposite direction. They finished as the first in Group A of 2014–15 Lega Pro season.

On 22 August 2015 Della Rocca was signed by Rimini in a temporary deal. In January 2016 an injury put an end to his season.

On 31 August 2016 he parted ways with Lecce as his contract was terminated in a mutual consent.

International career
He won the 2003 UEFA European Under-19 Championship with the Italian U-19 team. He participated in 2001 UEFA European Under-16 Championship, which was renamed to under-17 Championship after 2001 edition.

Personal life
He is the elder brother of Francesco Della Rocca.

Honours
 Lega Pro: 2015 (Novara)

References

External links
 FIGC  
 
 AIC profile (data by football.it)  
 La Gazzetta dello Sport profile (2007–08)  
 

1984 births
Living people
Italian footballers
Italy youth international footballers
Bologna F.C. 1909 players
Catania S.S.D. players
Atalanta B.C. players
Pisa S.C. players
U.S. Triestina Calcio 1918 players
A.S.D. Portogruaro players
A.C. Carpi players
U.S. Cremonese players
U.S. Lecce players
Novara F.C. players
Rimini F.C. 1912 players
Serie A players
Serie B players
Serie C players
Association football forwards
People from Brindisi
Footballers from Apulia
Sportspeople from the Province of Brindisi